Prarolo is a comune (municipality) in the Province of Vercelli in the Italian region Piedmont, located about  northeast of Turin and about  southeast of Vercelli.

Prarolo borders the following municipalities: Asigliano Vercellese, Palestro, Pezzana, and Vercelli.

Demographic evolution

References

Cities and towns in Piedmont